Upper Malone, also known as the Dub, is a multi-sport facility owned by Queen's University Belfast. There are fourteen outdoor pitches together with the Arena Pitch, which is the home ground of the university's football, rugby union and Gaelic football teams. It is the only facility in the British Isles that is home to all three codes of football. The Arena Pitch was opened in 2012 following a £20m redevelopment of the site.

References

Year of establishment missing
Association football venues in Northern Ireland
Sports venues in Belfast
Queen's University Belfast